Varkeys was a supermarket chain based in Kerala, India which is now defunct.  It had outlets in Cochin, Trichur, Calicut, and Trivandrum.  It also owned and operated a hypermarket chain known as V Mart. 

Other than just retailing it also had a bakery in every store it operated, selling traditional Kerala and Indian snacks which include pastries such as puffs, and samosas.

References

External links
 Official website

Supermarkets of India
Companies based in Kochi
1984 establishments in Kerala
Retail companies established in 1984
Indian companies established in 1984
Companies with year of disestablishment missing